The Chambliss Amateur Achievement Award is awarded by the American Astronomical Society for an achievement in astronomical research made by an amateur astronomer resident in North America. The prize is named after Carlson R. Chambliss of Kutztown University, who donated the funds to support the prize. The award will consist of a 224-gram (½-lb) silver medal and $1,000  cash.

Previous winners
Source: 
 2006 Brian D. Warner
 2007 Ronald H. Bissinger
 2008 Steve Mandel
 2009 Robert D. Stephens
 2010 R. Jay GaBany
 2011 Tim Puckett
 2012 Kian Jek
 2013 No award
 2014 Mike Simonsen
 2015 No award
 2016 Daryll LaCourse
 2017 No award
 2018 Donald G. Bruns
 2019 No award
 2020 Dennis Conti

See also

List of astronomy awards
List of awards named after people
Amateur Achievement Award of the Astronomical Society of the Pacific

References

External links 
AAS Grants and Prizes 

Astronomy prizes
American Astronomical Society